Plasmodium lepidoptiformis is a parasite of the genus Plasmodium.

Like all Plasmodium species P. lepidoptiformis has both vertebrate and insect hosts. The vertebrate hosts for this parasite are lizards.

Description 
This species was described by Telford and Telford in 2003.

Distribution 
It is found in Venezuela.

Hosts 
The only known vertebrate host is the lizard Kentropyx calcarata

References 

lepidoptiformis